Wisbech St Mary railway station was a station on the Midland and Great Northern Joint Railway line between Wisbech and Peterborough. Located in Wisbech St. Mary, it is now closed.

The station building is no longer standing, having been demolished in around 2006 to make way for a new housing development on Beechings Close.

References

External links
 Wisbech St Mary station on navigable 1946 O. S. map

Disused railway stations in Cambridgeshire
Former Midland and Great Northern Joint Railway stations
Railway stations in Great Britain opened in 1866
Railway stations in Great Britain closed in 1959
1866 establishments in England
Wisbech
1959 disestablishments in England